The 2011 Delaware State Hornets football team represented Delaware State University as a member of the Mid-Eastern Athletic Conference (MEAC) in the 2011 NCAA Division I FCS football season. The Hornets were led by first-year head coach Kermit Blount and played their home games at Alumni Stadium. They finished the season 3–8 overall and 1–7 in conference play to tie for ninth place in the MEAC.

Schedule

References

Delaware State
Delaware State Hornets football seasons
Delaware State Hornets football